Everyday People is a novel by the American writer Stewart O'Nan.

It is set in 1998 in East Liberty and brings together the stories of its residents, mostly African-American during one fateful week in the early fall. The novel centers around Chris "Crest" Tolbert—an eighteen-year-old left paralyzed and haunted by the loss of his best friend after a recent accident—and O'Nan weaves together the lives of friends and family, lovers and strangers, and their emotions, memories, and dreams.

References

2001 American novels
Fiction set in 1998
Novels set in the 1990s
Novels set in Pittsburgh